St. George's School is an IB World School, for students from age 2-18.

St George's is a private school and teaches the English National Curriculum (in form of IGCSE at Key Stage 4) and the IB Diploma Programme after Key Stage 4. 

St. George's is a coeducational and non-denominational school which is run independently from local or state financial support. School uniform is compulsory with the aim of improving discipline, reducing social exclusion and strengthening the identity of the school. It has schools in three German cities: Cologne, Düsseldorf Rhein-Ruhr and Munich. St. George's School Cologne was the first British boarding school in Germany.

Locations
St. George's School Cologne is the oldest school, founded in 1985. The school has been an International Baccalaureate World School since April 2006, and offers the IB Diploma Programme. 
St. George's has established two further schools, St. George's School Düsseldorf Rhein-Ruhr (opened in September 2002) and St. George's School Munich (opened in September 2013).

The Aachen location closed in July 2016.

See also
 German schools in the United Kingdom: German School London

References

External links
 

International Baccalaureate schools in Germany
Private schools in Germany
Boarding schools in Germany
International schools in North Rhine–Westphalia
Schools in Cologne
Rodenkirchen
Educational institutions established in 1985
1985 establishments in West Germany
British international schools in Germany